The Democratic Renewal Party (PRD) is a political party in Cape Verde.

History
The PRD was established in 2000 by Jacinto Santos, a former member of the Movement for Democracy, who had served as mayor of Praia. The party received 3.4% of the vote in the 2001 elections, but failed to win a seat in the National Assembly. Its vote share subsequently fell to 0.7% in the 2006 parliamentary elections.

References

Defunct political parties in Cape Verde
Political parties established in 2000
2000 establishments in Cape Verde